Edwin J. Collins (1875 – 14 January 1937) was a British film director of the silent era.

Selected filmography
 Doing His Bit (1917)
 Tom Jones (1917)
 God and the Man (1918)
 Calvary (1920)
 Miss Charity (1921)
 The God in the Garden (1921)
 Stella (1921)
 Single Life (1921)
 Esmeralda (1922)
 The Green Caravan (1922)
 The Taming of the Shrew (1923)
 A Gamble with Hearts (1923)

References

External links

1875 births
1937 deaths
British film directors
People from Cheltenham